This article describes National Historic Landmarks in the United States state of Connecticut.  These include the most highly recognized historic sites in Connecticut that are officially designated and/or funded and operated by the U.S. Federal Government.  There are no UNESCO-designated World Heritage Sites in Connecticut.  There are many additional historic sites in Connecticut that are federally recognized by listing on the National Register of Historic Places, but only those NRHP-listed sites meeting particularly higher standards are further designated as National Historic Landmarks.

Current National Historic Landmarks

|}

Former National Historic Landmarks

See also
National Register of Historic Places listings in Connecticut
List of U.S. National Historic Landmarks by state
List of National Natural Landmarks in Connecticut

References

External links

National Historic Landmarks Program, at National Park Service
National Park Service listings of National Historic Landmarks

 
Connecticut
National Historic Landmarks